Neha Mehta is an Indian television actress. She is best known for her role of Anjali Taarak Mehta in India's longest-running sitcom TV serial  Taarak Mehta Ka Ooltah Chashmah.

She ancestrally belongs to Patan, Gujarat, India but was brought up  in Vadodara and  Ahmedabad. She comes from a family that has deep roots in Gujarati literature and she herself is a Gujarati speaker. Her father is a popular writer who inspired her to become an actress. She holds a Master's degree in Performing arts (MPA), in Indian Classical Dance, and a Diploma in Vocal and drama.

Career
Mehta did Gujarati theatre for many years, Sahebji being one of the known ones. She started her Indian television career in 2001 Zee TV channel serial called Dollar Bahu. From 2002 to 2003 she played title role in STAR Plus TV serial Bhabhi'
She played the role of Kushik in Raat Hone Ko Hai in 2004.

In 2008 she played the role of Anjali Mehta in SAB TV's television series Taarak Mehta Ka Ooltah Chashmah which was currently her longest comedy television run. Anjali Mehta is the wife of the narrator and main character in the show, Taarak Mehta. Her character is a young, sophisticated, and modern woman. Anjali is a dietician and controls her husband Taarak Mehta's diet as well. She left the show in 2020.

She hosted a SAB TV show Wah! Wah! Kya Baat Hai!'' as herself with Shailesh Lodha from 2012–2013.

Filmography

Television

Films

References

External links

 

Living people
Indian television actresses
Actresses from Mumbai
Indian stage actresses
Gujarati theatre
Actresses in Hindi television
21st-century Indian actresses
People from Patan district
Actresses from Gujarat
1977 births